Gabriel Baron (1859–1928) was a French lawyer and politician. He served as the Mayor of Aix-en-Provence in 1896, and as a member of the National Assembly of France from 1897 to 1898, from 1902 to 1906, and from 1906 to 1910.

Biography

Early life
Gabriel Baron was born on 23 December 1859 in Marseille, Alpes-Maritimes department. He studied Law.

Career
He started his working life as a lawyer. He decided to embark upon a career in politics. He was elected to the General Council in 1895 and later served as the Mayor of Aix-en-Provence from 1896 to 1897.

Interested in gaining national clout, he ran in the legislative election of 1897, and won. He went on to serve as a member of the National Assembly for the Bouches-du-Rhône three times: from 14 March 1897 to 31 May 1898, from 11 May 1902 to 31 May 1906 and finally from 6 May 1906 to 31 May 1910. He was an Independent Socialist.

Death
He died on 22 October 1928 in Cannes, Alpes-Maritimes department.

References

1859 births
1928 deaths
Politicians from Marseille
Independent Socialists (France)
Members of the 6th Chamber of Deputies of the French Third Republic
Members of the 8th Chamber of Deputies of the French Third Republic
Members of the 9th Chamber of Deputies of the French Third Republic
Mayors of Aix-en-Provence
19th-century French lawyers